Stephen Whitburn is an American politician serving as a member of the San Diego City Council from the 3rd district. He assumed office in December 2020.

Early life and education 
Whitburn was born in West Germany and grew up in multiple states. He earned a Bachelor of Arts degree in Spanish and Latin American studies from the University of Wisconsin–Madison.

Career 
Whitburn started working for a radio station as a news reporter in Madison, Wisconsin for nine years before accepting a position for a radio station in San Diego. He then worked as a public affairs manager for the American Red Cross, later taking roles as directors of San Diego Pride and the Southern California chapter of the American Cancer Society.

He ran for the San Diego City Council seat vacated by Chris Ward, who left to become a member of the California State Assembly representing California's 78th State Assembly district. He won his primary race and defeated general election candidate, Toni Duran.

After assuming office in December 2020, he became president pro tempore of the San Diego City Council for the 2020–2021 term.

References 

San Diego City Council members
Politicians from San Diego
University of Wisconsin–Madison alumni
Year of birth missing (living people)
Living people